The 2004 World Rally Championship was the 32nd season of the FIA World Rally Championship. The season consisted of 16 rallies. The drivers' world championship was won by Sébastien Loeb in a Citroën Xsara WRC, ahead of Petter Solberg and Markko Märtin. The manufacturers' title was won by Citroën, ahead of Ford and Subaru.

The video game WRC 4: The Official Game of the FIA World Rally Championship was based on this season.

Calendar
The 2004 championship was contested over sixteen rounds in Europe, North America, Asia, South America and Oceania.

Teams and drivers

JWRC entries

PWRC entries

Results and standings

Drivers' championship

 Sébastien Loeb secured the drivers' championship title in Tour de Corse.

Manufacturers' championship

 Citroën secured the manufacturers' championship in Tour de Corse.

JWRC Drivers' championship

Events

External links 

 FIA World Rally Championship 2004 at ewrc-results.com

World Rally Championship
World Rally Championship seasons